Saraya may refer to:

People
Saraya (wrestler) (born 1992), English professional wrestler, formerly known as Paige
Sweet Saraya (born 1971), English professional wrestler, mother of Saraya

Places
Saraya, Pazardzhik Province, a village in southern Bulgaria
Saraya, Senegal, a small town with commune status in south-east Senegal
Saraya Department, one of the 45 departments of Senegal
El Saraya (neighborhood), a neighborhood in Alexandria, Egypt
Seraya (also spelled Saraya), a historical building in Nazareth, Israel

Other uses
Saraya (band), a former American rock band
Saraya (newspaper), an Arabic online newspaper based in Amman, Jordan
Saraya Aqaba, a Jordanian private shareholding company
Saraya Ahl al-Sham, a rebel alliance active in the Syrian Civil War 
Saray (building), also known as saraya

See also
Sarai (disambiguation), including Serai and Saraj
Saray (disambiguation)
Sarayu (disambiguation)
Sariya (disambiguation)
Seraiah, a Hebrew name
Seraya (disambiguation)
Soraya (disambiguation)